Rock Drill may refer to:
 Rock Drill (Jacob Epstein), a 1913 sculpture by Jacob Epstein
 Rock Drill (Ezra Pound), a section of The Cantos, a 1956 work by Ezra Pound
 Rock Drill (album), a 1978 album by Sensational Alex Harvey Band
 "Rock Drill", a 2006 song by The Chemical Brothers

See also
 Drifter (drill)